Markleville may refer to:
Markleville, former name of Markleeville, California
Markleville, Indiana